Asian immigrants to Sweden are citizens and residents of Sweden who were born in or have ancestry from nations in Asia. Due to immigration, from 2000 to 2020, Sweden's Asian-born population grew by 577,651.

Many immigrants to Sweden are from Asia, with Syria and Iraq being the largest countries of Asian origin.

History
Major waves of Asian immigration began due to political turmoil in various Asian countries. This notably began in the 1970s, when about 40,000 immigrants from Turkey came to the country. From 1985 to 1995, almost 40,000 Iranians immigrated to Sweden after the Iranian Revolution, and during this same time, about 15,000 Lebanese immigrants came to Sweden due to conflict in their homeland.

By 2003, Sweden had about 16,000 people from Syria. Since the 1990s, Iraqis have been one of the largest Asian immigrant groups, with almost 70,000 people. In 2009, about 388,037 people in Sweden were born in an Asian country.

Demographics
According to Statistics Sweden, as of 2020, there is a total 310,293 residents of Sweden who hold citizenship from countries in Asia and 798,328 who were born in any of the countries of Asia.

According to Statistics Sweden, as of 2016, there is a total of 8,541 foreign-born children and young adults aged 0-21 who are adopted in Sweden. Of these individuals, the most common countries of birth are China (3,977), South Korea (1,735), Colombia (1,438), Vietnam (1,241), and India (1,017).

As of 2020, Sweden's Asian Demographics include:
 Central Asian origins: 7,924 (Kazakh, Kyrgyz, Tajik, Uzbek)
 East Asian origins: 51,449 (Chinese, Japanese, Korean, Mongolian)
 Southeast Asian origins: 81,556 (Filipino, Indonesian, Thai, Vietnamese)
 South Asian origins: 104,480 (Afghan, Bangladeshis, Indian, Pakistani)
 West Asian origins: (Iraqis, Syrians, Iranians, Lebanese, etc)

See also
 Arabs in Sweden
 Asian people
 Immigration to Sweden
 Buddhism in Sweden
 Chinese people in Sweden
 Swedish Indians
 Swedish Iranians
 Swedish Iraqis

Notes

References

External sources
 
 

Sweden

Asian